Flor Aideé Pablo Medina (born 20 September 1974) is a Peruvian teacher, educator, and politician. She is currently a member of Congress from the Purple Party. She ran as Julio Guzmán's first running-mate in the 2021 general election.

Biography
Flor Pablo Medina was born in the town of San Marcos, in the Huari Province, in the Ancash Region of Peru. At the age of 6 she and her family moved to Lima, the capital of the country. Growing up she studied at the Presentation of María Educational Institute, a women's parochial college located in the Comas District.

She earned her undergraduate degree from the National University of San Marcos, with a specialty in language and literature. Pablo Medina also has completed postgraduate studies in management and public programs.

In the public sector, she held the position of national director of Primary Education in the Ministry of Education, during the administration of educational minister Patricia Salas, in the government of Ollanta Humala.

In July 2014, she was appointed as the regional director of education for Metropolitan Lima.

In 2018 she worked as head of the technical team of the National Education Council, and at the beginning of 2019 as she was appointed as executive secretary of the Peruvian National Education Council.

On 11 March 2019 Pablo Medina was sworn in as Minister of Education of the Peru of the government of President Martin Vizcarra, replacing Daniel Alfaro Paredes.

References

1974 births
Living people
People from Ancash Region
National University of San Marcos alumni
Government ministers of Peru
Peruvian educators